Asa Kinney (May 21, 1810October 3, 1886) was an American businessman, politician, and Wisconsin pioneer.  He represented southern Milwaukee County in the Wisconsin State Senate during the 1st and 2nd legislatures (1848, 1849).

Biography

Born in Homer, New York, Kinney moved to Milwaukee, Wisconsin Territory, in 1836 and settled in Oak Creek where he had a farm. Kinney served in the first Wisconsin Constitutional Convention. Then, in 1847–1848, Kinney served in the Wisconsin Territorial Legislature in the Wisconsin Territorial House of Representatives. He served in the first Wisconsin State Senate in 1848-1849 as a Democrat. He moved to Plumas County, California to mine in 1852 and was elected as the first member of the California State Assembly from Plumas County in 1854, again as a Democrat. Kinney moved back to Wisconsin after the Assembly adjourned (without even going back to Plumas County) and settled in Ripon, Wisconsin. He served on the Ripon Common Council and was street commissioner. He also served as sergeant at arms in the Wisconsin Senate. In 1861, Kinney served as quartermaster in the 4th Wisconsin Infantry Regiment during the American Civil War. He was discharged because of health. He then enlisted in the 1st Wisconsin Volunteer Cavalry Regiment and was commissioned a lieutenant and assigned to quartermaster. He stayed in the regiment until the end of the Civil War. In 1871, Kinney moved with some colonists from Ripon, Wisconsin, to Kansas where they helped plat the community of Russell, Kansas. Kinney served as a local judge in Russell and was in the banking and insurance businesses in Kansas and Wisconsin. Kinney died in Russell, Kansas.

References

|-

1810 births
1886 deaths
People from Homer, New York
Politicians from Milwaukee
People from Plumas County, California
People from Oak Creek, Wisconsin
People from Russell, Kansas
People of the California Gold Rush
People of Wisconsin in the American Civil War
Members of the Wisconsin Territorial Legislature
Democratic Party Wisconsin state senators
Wisconsin city council members
Employees of the Wisconsin Legislature
Democratic Party members of the California State Assembly
Businesspeople from Kansas
Businesspeople from Milwaukee
19th-century American politicians
People from Ripon, Wisconsin
19th-century American businesspeople